Air Marshal Sir Horace Ernest Philip Wigglesworth,  (11 July 1896 – 31 May 1975) was a senior officer in the Royal Air Force.

RAF career
Educated at Chesterfield Grammar School, Wigglesworth joined the Royal Naval Air Service, a precursor of the Royal Air Force, in 1915, flying both fighters and bombers. His actions during an aerial battle on 23 January 1917 resulted in a Distinguished Service Cross for "conspicuous gallantry and enterprise": he suffered serious frostbite in that action.

Wigglesworth served in the Second World War as head of the Combined Planning Staff at Headquarters Middle East Command, as Senior Air Staff Officer at Headquarters RAF Middle East and then as Air Officer Commanding AHQ East Africa. He became Deputy Air Commander-in-Chief at Mediterranean Air Command in 1943 and Deputy Chief of Staff (Air) at SHAEF in 1944. After the War he was commander of the British Air Forces of Occupation from 1946 to 1948 when he retired.

Wigglesworth was appointed a Knight Commander of the Order of the British Empire in the 1946 New Year Honours. He later became President of the Old Cestrefeldian Society.

See also
Cecil Wigglesworth

References

1896 births
1975 deaths
Commanders of the Legion of Merit
Commanders of the Order of George I
Commandeurs of the Légion d'honneur
Companions of the Order of the Bath
Knights Commander of the Order of the British Empire
Recipients of the Croix de Guerre 1914–1918 (France)
Recipients of the Distinguished Service Cross (United Kingdom)
Royal Air Force air marshals of World War II
Royal Naval Air Service aviators